Rosa Amores Valls, born in Nules, Spain, on 26 January 1938, is a Spanish singer, known for her burlesque performances and variety shows. Her stage name is Rosita Amores. Amores is one of the leading variety performers and erotic artists of Valencia, and gained fame during the 1960s and 1970s.

Films 
 El virgo de Visanteta (1979). Dir. Vicente Escrivá
 Gracias por la propina (1997). Dir. Francesc Bellmunt
 Visanteta, estáte quieta (1979). Dir. Vicente Escrivá
 Con el culo al aire (1980). Dir. Carles Mira
 Un negro con un saxo (1988). Dir. Francesc Bellmunt
 El robo más grande jamás contado (2002) Dir. Daniel Monzón

References 

Spanish women singers
Living people
1938 births
Burlesque performers
Spanish erotic artists